Hugo Kametani (born 26 January 1999) is a Japanese footballer who plays as a forward for Union Omaha in USL League One.

Career

Pima Community College
Kametani began attending Pima Community College in 2017, where he played two seasons for the men's soccer team. In 2018 he scored the game-winning goal in overtime to win Pima their first national championship. He scored 30 goals in his sophomore season, and was named the Junior College Division I men's national player of the year.

Nebraska-Omaha
After his time at Pima Community College, Kametani began attending the University of Nebraska-Omaha. Kametani played two seasons for the men's soccer team, and in 2020 was the Summit League Newcomer of the Year as well as named to the All-Summit First Team. In his two seasons with the Mavericks, Kametani scored 11 goals in 28 games.

Union Omaha
Kametani stayed in Omaha to begin his professional career, signing with Union Omaha of USL League One in 2022 after participating in an invitational camp. Kametani made his professional debut the following April, starting in Omaha's second round match in the U.S. Open Cup. He scored his first professional goal in his second match, a 2–2 draw against Forward Madison in Omaha's opening match of the 2022 season.

References

1999 births
Living people
Association football forwards
Union Omaha players
USL League One players
USL League Two players
Des Moines Menace players
Japanese footballers